Frank Stevenson may refer to:

Frank A. Stevenson, software developer
Frank Stevenson, character in The Ambassador (1984 American film)
Frank J. Stevenson, agriculture Scientist.

See also
 Francis Seymour Stevenson (1862–1938), British Liberal Party politician, author and scholar
Frank Stephenson (disambiguation)